Nicholas Geffroy (c. 1761 - before February 9, 1839) was an American silversmith and watchmaker, active in Newport, Rhode Island.

Geffroy was born in Granville, Manche in France. He married Sarah Shaw in Newport on September 29, 1795, and before 1802 became a partner with her father, John Allen Shaw, as JOHN A. SHAW & Co. In June 1817 he was appointed Newport's Surveyor of Highways.

In a curious incident in 1801, a letter to President Thomas Jefferson was sent from someone purporting to be Geffroy. The letter detailed accusations against many citizens and office-holders, and insisted that "A purification is necessary, & we cannot be purified unless you cleanse the Augean Stable completely." Geffroy received a response from Jefferson, but doubted its authenticity and denied having ever written to the President. The United States Senator Christopher Ellery, a local resident, vouched for its authenticity and apparently impounded the letter for return to Jefferson. Ellery in turn accused Congressman John Rutledge Jr. of South Carolina, also then resident in Newport, of having forged this and another letter from Geffroy. These "Geffroy letters" were subsequently published in the Newport Rhode-Island Republican on September 18, 1802, under the headline "Rutledge's Letters To the President of the United States." As noted in that article, although Geffroy possessed some mastery of spoken English, it was doubted that he could write, "with any degree of correctness, a single sentence of the language." After a flurry of accusations and affidavits, Rutledge challenged Ellery to a duel, which he declined. Rutledge assaulted Ellery in January 1803, "publicly caning him and pulling him by the nose and ears". Although Rutledge vehemently maintained his innocence in the affair, he decided not to seek reelection in 1803 given the negative publicity.

In another curious incident recorded by Channing, "a sudden and most malignant disease appeared in the house of Mr. Nicholas Geffroy... supposed to have originated from some foul substances thrown upon the ground occupied by Mr. Geffroy." Several of Geffroy's mechanics died within a few hours of being attacked, but the illness did not spread beyond a few houses on either side of Geffroy.

Geffroy's work is collected in the Metropolitan Museum of Art and Yale University Art Gallery.

References 
 "Nicholas Geffroy", American Silversmiths.
 American Silversmiths and Their Marks: The Definitive (1948) Edition, Stephen Guernsey Cook Ensko, xxx, page 220.
 Rhode Island Genealogical Register, Volume 15, A. G. Beaman, 1992, page 240.
 Nicholas Geffroy watch paper
 Letter to Thomas Jefferson from “Nicholas Geffroy,” 1 August 1801
 A Defence against Calumny; or, Haman, in the shape of C. Ellery, Esq., hung upon his own gallows. Being the substance of certain publications ... refuting the accusation against J. Rutledge, of writing two letters to the President of the United States, urging the "displacement" of all the Federalists in Rhode Island, and the appointment to office of such persons as should be recommended by C. Ellery, John RUTLEDGE (Member of Congress.), Christopher ELLERY, 1803, pages 28–29.
 A Contribution to the Bibliography and Literature of Newport, R. I.: Comprising a List of Books Published Or Printed, in Newport, with Notes and Additions, Charles Edward Hammett, C. E. Hammett, jun., 1887, page 46.
 Early Recollections of Newport, R. I.: From the Year 1793 to 1811, George Gibbs Channing, A. J. Ward, C. E. Hammett, jr., 1868, pages 256-257.

American silversmiths
1839 deaths
Year of birth uncertain
American watchmakers (people)
People from Granville, Manche
French emigrants to the United States
People from Newport, Rhode Island